Justice Chowdhary is an action Hindi film made in 2000 directed by Manish R. Khandelwal and produced by Rishikesh Dhorsimha Faruque. It is a revenge drama, with Mithun in the lead role, it is a remake of a Telugu film of the same name, starring N.T. Ramarao and directed by K. Raghavendra Rao.

Plot
Justice Chowdhary is an honest judge with high morality. A local don murders his family members. To take revenge Chowdhary left his service and tries to eliminate them. He takes law in his hand.

Cast
Mithun Chakraborty
Ravi Kishan
Shakti Kapoor
Swathi
Seema Shinde
Arun Bakshi
Pramod Moutho
Mukesh Raaj Singh

References

External links

2000 films
2000s Hindi-language films
Mithun's Dream Factory films
Films shot in Ooty
Indian crime action films
Films scored by Bappi Lahiri